The Canadian 10 km Road Race Championships is the annual national championships for the 10K in Canada sanctioned by Athletics Canada.

The event is currently hosted as part of the Ottawa Race Weekend since 2015.

It was previously hosted by the Oasis Zoo Run in Toronto until 2014.

Results

See also
Athletics Canada
Canadian records in track and field
Canadian Track and Field Championships
Canadian Marathon Championships
Canadian Half Marathon Championships
Canadian 5Km Road Race Championships
Sports in Canada

References

Annual sporting events in Canada